Gamča, today officially Gymnázium, Grösslingová 18, Bratislava, is a public coeducational gymnasium located in Bratislava, Slovakia. It educates around 600 pupils in 8-year long and 4-year long programs leading to Maturita. It was founded in 1626 by Peter Cardinal Pazmáň (Péter Pázmany) as Collegium Posoniense.

Gamča's focus on mathematics, natural sciences and computer sciences brought 56 of its students to successfully represent Slovakia (Czechoslovakia) at the International Mathematical Olympiad, 26 students at the International Physics Olympiad and 14 at the International Olympiad in Informatics in the past 35 years.

Since 1988, the school's popular "Olympic games", OH Gamča, are held annually.

History
Cardinal Archbishop of Esztergom Petrus Pazmanus founded Collegium Posoniense on September 11, 1626, with the approval of the 6th Jesuit Superior General Mutio Vitelleschi and Ferdinand II, Holy Roman Emperor.

Building
The current building was designed by Ödön Lechner and built in 1906–08. Few years later its "chapel", today known as Church of St. Elisabeth (Bratislava), was added. The school  building was completely renovated in 2008–10.

OH Gamča
Olympijské hry Gamča (Gamča's Olympic Games) are held from September to December every year since 1988, when inspired by the 1988 Olympic Games in Seoul the first games were organized to celebrate the 70th anniversary of Czechoslovakia. During the games, classes (i.e. ~30 students, ~4 classes in every year) are competing against each other in sport, art, academic and "unconventional" disciplines to win the overall title. Every games have their official name/mascot, which traditionally includes letters O and H. The OH Gamča in school year 2021/22 are officially called OH Hokus Pokus 2022.

Notable alumni
Both current students and alumni are called Gamčáci (m) and Gamčáčky (f).
 Philipp Lenard (1862 - 1947) - physicist and Nobel Prize Laureate
 Béla Bartók (1881 - 1945) - composer and pianist
 Gustáv Husák (1913 - 1991) - former President of Czechoslovakia
 Ján Vilček (b. 1933) - biomedical scientist, educator, inventor and philanthropist
 Milan Lasica (1940 - 2021) - playwright, director, actor and singer
 Robert Redhammer (b.1963) - former Rector of Slovak University of Technology and current Chairman of the Executive Board of The Slovak Accreditation Agency for Higher Education
 Lucia Žitňanská (b. 1964) - former Member of National Council and former Minister of Justice
 Daniel Lipšic (b. 1973) - former Member of the National Council, former Minister of Justice, former Minister of Interior of Slovakia and current Special Prosecutor

External links 

 Gamča
 OH Chaos 2015

Gymnasiums in Slovakia
Schools in Bratislava
Educational institutions established in the 1620s
1626 establishments in the Habsburg monarchy
20th-century architecture in Slovakia
Art Nouveau architecture in Slovakia
Art Nouveau educational buildings